Sam Thompson (born 1978) is a British novelist.

His novel Communion Town was longlisted for the 2012 Man Booker Prize as one of top 12 novels chosen, but was not shortlisted into the Final 6.

References

21st-century British male writers
21st-century British novelists
British male novelists
Living people
1978 births
Place of birth missing (living people)